The S4 district lies within in the City of Sheffield, South Yorkshire, England.  The district contains 25 listed buildings that are recorded in the National Heritage List for England.  Of these, one is listed at Grade II*, the middle grade, and the others are at Grade II, the lowest grade.  The district is lies north-east of central Sheffield, and includes the areas of Grimesthorpe, Osgathorpe, Page Hall, Pitsmoor and Victoria Quays.

For neighbouring areas, see listed buildings in Sheffield City Centre, listed buildings in S2, listed buildings in S3, listed buildings in S5 and listed buildings in S9.



Key

Buildings

References 

 - A list of all the listed buildings within Sheffield City Council's boundary is available to download from this page.

Sources

 
Sheffield